The Haunted Inn is a 1828 melodrama by the British writer Richard Brinsley Peake. It was first acted at the Theatre Royal, Drury Lane and was part of a group of plays that used a country inn as a setting for sinister or threatening events.

References

Bibliography
 Burwick, Frederick. A History of Romantic Literature. John Wiley & Sons, 2019.
 Kabatchnik, Amnon. Blood on the Stage, 1800 to 1900: Milestone Plays of Murder, Mystery, and Mayhem. Rowman & Littlefield, 2017.
 Nicoll, Allardyce . A History of English Drama 1660-1900, Volume 4. Cambridge University Press, 2009.

1828 plays
Plays by Richard Brinsley Peake
West End plays